Willie Harden Gillus (born September 1, 1963) is an American former gridiron football player and coach.  He played professionally as a quarterback in the National Football League (NFL) and the Canadian Football League (CFL). Gillus served as the head football coach at Norfolk State University from 2003 to 2004.

Playing career
Gillus played college football at Norfolk State University in Norfolk, Virginia. As a quarterback, he set various passing records in the history of the football program, and led the Spartans to their only Division II football playoff appearance in 1984.

Gillus was a member of the Green Bay Packers during the 1987 NFL season, and then played five seasons in the Canadian Football League (CFL).

Coaching career
After his playing career was over, Gillus went into coaching in high school football in Surry County, Virginia, during the late 1990s.
He later became head football coach at his alma mater, for two years (2003 and 2004), before serving one year as the quarterbacks and running backs coach for the Winnipeg Blue Bombers of the CFL in 2005. Gillus was the assistant head coach and quarterbacks  coach at Elizabeth City State University in Elizabeth City, North Carolina.

Head coaching record

See also
 List of Green Bay Packers players

References

External links
 

1963 births
Living people
American football quarterbacks
Canadian football quarterbacks
Elizabeth City State Vikings football coaches
Green Bay Packers players
Kansas City Chiefs players
National Football League replacement players
Norfolk State Spartans football coaches
Norfolk State Spartans football players
Toronto Argonauts players
Winnipeg Blue Bombers coaches
High school football coaches in Virginia
People from Emporia, Virginia
Coaches of American football from Virginia
Players of American football from Virginia
African-American coaches of American football
African-American players of American football
African-American players of Canadian football
20th-century African-American sportspeople
21st-century African-American sportspeople